Gloria CFR Galați was a football club based in Galaţi, Galați County, Romania. It was founded in 1932 and dissolved in 1970.

History

The club was founded in 1932 January 1, at the initiative of the railroad workers from Galați, after the merger of Șoimii Gloria (founded in 1927) with CFR.  The initial colours of the jersey's were yellow-blue.  The club's initial name was Asociația Sportivă și Culturală (Cultural and Sports Association).

Until 1936 the team plays in the districtual championship after which it promotes to the Divizia C. One year later it qualifies to the Divizia B and after two more seasons, Gloria promotes to the Divizia A. At this level, it manages to play for two seasons, until 1941. In 1942, because of WW II, the championship is interrupted, with the club on the 2nd position of the table.

In 1946, after the war, Gloria missed the chance of a quick come-back to the Divizia A, after it lost the play-off against Prahova Ploieşti, 2–5 overall.

During the 1946–1951 period the club plays in the Divizia B, and changes its name two times, CFR (1948) and Locomotiva (1950). In 1951 it relegates, but manages to come back in 1955, only to relegate at the end of the season. From now forward, the role of this old club weekends gradually as new clubs appear with superior organizational structure.

In 1957, the club came back to its traditional name of Gloria CFR, but with no big success, not being able to pass the Divizia C where it was seen almost regularly, until 1970, after which it disappears.

Great players: J. Lăpușneanu, Justin Apostol, E. Prasler, Șt. Cucula, M. Rădulescu, I. Bodea, Șt. Cârjan, Guță Tănase, C. Comșa, M. Tudose, Zapis I, Zapis II, Ivanov, Ad. Popa, C. Voroncovchi.

In 1988 the name of Gloria CFR reappears after Dunărea CSU Galaţi is renamed (with no relations with the old club), but only until 1994 when its renamed again, to FC Constant, and in 1995 back to Dunărea Galați.

Honours

Liga I:
Winners (0):, Best finnish: 10th 1939–40

Liga II:
Winners (1): 1938–39

Liga III:
Winners (0):
Runners-up (1): 1936–37

Notable players

Alexandru Tănase
Manole Rădulescu
Jean Lăpușneanu
Justin Apostol
Adrian Oprea
Adrian Bontea
Haralambie Antohi
Adalbert Demeny
Andrei Szutor
Aurel Horotan
Constantin Surugiu
Constantin Jarca
Constantin Bărbulescu
Ernest Prassler
Gheorghe Ionescu

Gheorghe Iordăchescu
Ioan Bodea
Ioan Kiss
Ştefan Cucula
Ştefan Milea
Ştefan Zapis
Teofil Topa
Tiberiu Kocsiardy
Victor Mihăilescu
Victor Pancoff
Victor Setel
Mircea Tudose
Ladislau Strock 3
Nicolae Găman
Octavian Comşa

Association football clubs established in 1932
Association football clubs disestablished in 1970
Defunct football clubs in Romania
Football clubs in Galați County
Liga I clubs
Liga II clubs
Sport in Galați
1932 establishments in Romania
1970 disestablishments in Romania